The 2020 Liberty Flames baseball team represented Liberty University in the sport of baseball for the 2020 college baseball season.  The Flames competed in Division I of the National Collegiate Athletic Association (NCAA) and the Atlantic Sun Conference.  They played their home games at Liberty Baseball Stadium in Lynchburg, Virginia.  The team was coached by Scott Jackson, who was in his fourth season at Liberty.

Previous season

The 2019 Flames finished 40–19 overall, and 15–9 in the conference. In the 2019 Atlantic Sun Conference baseball tournament championship game, they beat the Stetson Hatters to win their first ever ASUN title. They lost in the Chapel Hill Regional during the 2019 NCAA Division I baseball tournament.

Schedule and results

Schedule Source:

References

Liberty
Liberty Flames baseball seasons
Liberty Flames baseball